Radio Tešanj is a Bosnian local commercial radio station, broadcasting from Tešanj, Bosnia and Herzegovina. This radio station broadcasts a variety of programs such as music and local news.

History
It was founded on 1 January 1969 as local/municipal Radio Sarajevo network affiliate from 1969 until 1992 when the war in Bosnia and Herzegovina started. During the war, with the establishment of the new national public service broadcaster RTVBiH - Radio BiH (now BHRT - BH Radio 1) radio stations from the former Radio Sarajevo 2 local network generally continued to operate as local public radio stations under the jurisdiction of local authorities in Bosnia and Herzegovina (municipalities, cantons).

In March 2000, Radio Tešanj was re-registered in Communications Regulatory Agency of Bosnia and Herzegovina as private, commercial radio station.

Program is mainly produced in Bosnian language at one FM frequency (Tešanj ) and it is available in the city of Tešanj as well as in nearby municipalities in Zenica-Doboj Canton area.

Estimated number of listeners of Radio Tešanj is around 122.459.

Frequencies
 Tešanj

See also 
 List of radio stations in Bosnia and Herzegovina
 Antena Radio Jelah
 Radio Zos
 Radio Zenica
 Radio Tuzla
 Radio Visoko

References

External links 
 www.radiotesanj.ba
 www.opcina-tesanj.ba
 www.radiostanica.ba
 www.fmscan.org
 Communications Regulatory Agency of Bosnia and Herzegovina
Mass media in Tešanj
Tešanj
Radio stations established in 1969
Radio stations established in 2000